Isparta Museum is a museum in Isparta, Turkey.

The museum was opened on 6 March 1985. Following a restoration it was reopened in 2003. But an (undated) picture in Gooogle Maps (viewed in 2023), as well as Google view itself show the place in ruins. A statement that it would be restored in three years is four years old in 2023. It must be doubted if there is anything yet. Don't be fooled by other sources one can find, that all seem to describe the old situation. And please update this text if the museum is back.

Items
There are four main halls; archaeology, ethnography, treasure and carpet. Also in the passage to archaeology hall a typical Isparta house is displayed.

In archaeology hall, sculptures, iconas and steles are displayed. Most important item is a Eurymedon sculpture from Aksu Zindan cave. In treasury hall, coins of Hellenistic Pisidia, Roman Empire, Byzantine Empire, Seljukid, Ottoman Empire and other Islamic age coins are exhibited. Ottoman medals are also exhibited in this section. There are illumination gadgets, clothes, accessories, weapons, firmans (decrees), weighting instruments, coffee accessories are in the ethnographic hall. Carpet hall especially notable for Isparta is known as one of the carpet and rose producing cities of Turkey. In this hall in addition to Isparta carpets, carpets from Uşak, Gördes, Çanakkale, Bergama, Antalya , Nevşehir, Kırşehir, Kayseri, East Anatolia and Konya are exhibited. Instruments for distillation of attar of roses are also displayed in the carpet hall. Finally in the yard of the museum, rock carved items such as tombstones are displayed There are 16911 items (including coins) in the museum

Gallery

References

Buildings and structures in Isparta Province
Archaeological museums in Turkey
1985 establishments in Turkey
Museums established in 1985
Tourist attractions in Isparta Province
Ethnographic museums in Turkey